
Robert Joseph 'Dolly' Dunn (c. 1941 – 11 July 2009) was an Australian convicted child molester. He was a school teacher by profession, working for the Marist Brothers, a Catholic religious order.

Robert 'Dolly' Dunn taught science at Marist Brothers Penshurst, NSW from 1971 to 1987. 

He began a 20-year jail sentence in 2001 for 24 sexual offences occurring between 1985 and 1995.

In 1996, a Royal Commission chaired by Justice James Woods was shown home videos and photographs from Dunn's collection, which included many images of child sex abuse, usually featuring Dunn himself as the perpetrator. Dunn fled the country, but was later found in Honduras after being tracked down by Australia's 60 Minutes program. Former U.S. Secretary of State Madeleine Albright authorised his extradition back to Australia after he was deported from Honduras to the United States.

Dunn had a long history of abusing boys between the ages of seven and fifteen years old, often videotaping them. Usually, he would offer them money and marijuana in exchange for anal sex. From jail, he repeatedly made written and verbal statements to the effect that he saw nothing wrong with sex between a man and a boy. He previously spent time in Indonesia and the Netherlands. Dunn taught at Penshurst Marist with Bill ' Jedda ' Allen and Greg Hammond, fellow Science Teachers and fellow Paedophiles.

He was a friend and accomplice of Australian diplomat William Stuart Brown, another convicted child molester.

Health issues
In 2004 after suffering from angina Dunn underwent coronary bypass surgery. Believed to be at high risk of retaliation from other prisoners, he was isolated from the main prison population. Dunn died on 11 July 2009, aged 68, from multiple organ failure. He would not have been eligible for parole until 9 November 2015.

See also
 List of Australian criminals

References

External links
Sydney Morning Herald
MAKO
Connection to William Brown
Franca Arena's question in the NSW Parliament

1941 births
2009 deaths
20th-century Australian criminals
21st-century Australian criminals
Australian people convicted of child sexual abuse
Australian people who died in prison custody
Australian rapists
Australian schoolteachers
Date of birth missing
Deaths from multiple organ failure
Drug dealers
Place of birth missing
Prisoners who died in New South Wales detention
Crime in Oceania
Sexual violence in Oceania